The Hon. Richard Cartwright (February 2, 1759 – July 27, 1815) was a businessman, judge and political figure in Upper Canada.

Early life
Richard Cartwright was born at Albany, New York in 1759. His father, Richard Cartwright, had immigrated there from England in 1742. His mother, Joanne Beasley, was from a 'loyal Dutch family', and his father, an innkeeper and small landowner, soon became a pillar of the local community and was able to educate Richard privately.

Family loyalty questioned
During the American Revolution his father tried to remain as neutral as possible in the now rebel-occupied Albany, but a letter from Richard was intercepted by the authorities in 1777; this showed his loyalty was not with the American Patriots.

Departs for Canada
The younger Richard was allowed to leave for Quebec, but following his departure, now tainted by their son's loyalism to the Crown, his parents were abused and their property was 'destroyed and plundered', before they were 'conveyed away by guard to Crown Point' in 1778.

At Fort Niagara, the young Cartwright found employment as secretary to John Butler, and took part in military expeditions with his Loyalist regiment into New York. He soon saw the potential profits in supplying the British army; in 1780 he ended his military career and formed a partnership with Robert Hamilton.

Life at Kingston
In 1783, Cartwright moved from Carleton Island where he operated a trading post, and settled at nearby Cataraqui (now Kingston) where he continued his business endeavours.  His business interests expanded to include importing and exporting goods, manufacturing, retailing, milling, shipbuilding, and land speculation. He was an early proponent of free trade with the United States.

Political career
In 1788, he became a judge in the Court of Common Pleas and, in 1789, was named to the land board for the Mecklenburg District. He became a member of the Legislative Council for the province in 1792. He helped bring John Strachan to Upper Canada in 1792 to help improve educational facilities in the province. Unlike Lieutenant Governor John Graves Simcoe, Cartwright believed that English institutions should be adapted to Upper Canada's needs, and he opposed encouraging Americans to immigrate to the province. He served as an officer in the militia during the War of 1812. Cartwright died in Kingston in 1815.

Family
He was a cousin of politician and businessman Richard Beasley. In 1785 Cartwright married Magdalen Secord, from a well-known Loyalist family, sister-in-law of Laura Secord. His son, John Solomon, became a judge, businessman and political figure in the Province of Canada. Another son, Robert, married Harriet Dobbs, a Christian philanthropist.  Their son, Sir Richard John Cartwright, became a Kingston lawyer and Canadian political figure.

The former township of Cartwright in Durham County was named in his honour.

Archives
There is a Cartwright Family Fonds with the Ontario provincial archives, consisting of documents from 1799 to 1913.  The documents were generated by Richard Cartwright, his sons John Solomon Cartwright and the Reverend Robert David Cartwright, Robert's wife Harriet (Dobbs) Cartwright and their son, Sir Richard Cartwright.

References

Biography at the Dictionary of Canadian Biography Online Retrieved 2016-04-07
Osborne, Brian S. and Donald Swainson. Kingston, Building on the Past for the Future. Quarry Heritage Books, 2011. 
Mika, Nick and Helma et al. Kingston, Historic City. Belleville: Mika Publishing Co., 1987. .

External links
Life and letters of the late Hon. Richard Cartwright
Cartwright family fonds, Archives of Ontario

1759 births
1815 deaths
American emigrants to pre-Confederation Ontario
Canadian people of English descent
Immigrants to the Province of Quebec (1763–1791)
Lawyers from Albany, New York
Members of the Legislative Council of Upper Canada
Politicians from Albany, New York
Pre-Confederation Canadian businesspeople
Province of Quebec (1763–1791) judges
United Empire Loyalists
Upper Canada judges
19th-century American lawyers